This is a list of ring galaxies. A ring galaxy, as the name suggests, is a disc or spiral galaxy with its galactic disc structured or distorted into a ring or torus-like appearance. Hoag's Object, discovered by Art Hoag in 1950, is the prototypical example of a ring galaxy.


Formation theories 
Ring galaxies are theorized to be formed through multiple possible situations:

1. Bar instability – a phenomenon where the rotational velocity of the bar in a barred spiral galaxy increases to the point of spiral spin-out. Under typical conditions, gravitational density waves would favor the creation of spiral arms. When bar instability occurs, these density waves are instead migrated out into a ring-structure by the pressure, force, and gravitational influence of the byronic and dark matter furiously orbiting about the bar. This migration forces the stars, gas and dust found within the former arms into a torus-like region, forming a ring, and often igniting star formation.

2. Galactic collisions- another observed way that ring galaxies can form is through the process of two or more galaxies colliding. The cartwheel galaxy, galaxy pair AM 2026-424, and Arp 147 are all examples of ring galaxies believed to be formed from this process. In pass-through galactic collisions, an often smaller galaxy will pass through the disc of an often larger spiral, causing an outward push of the arms, as if dropping a rock into a pond of still water. In side-swipe and head-on collisions, the appearance of a perfect ring are less likely, with chaotic and warped appearances dominating.

3. Intergalactic medium accretion- this method has been inferred through the existence of Hoag's object, along with UV observations of several other large and ultra-large super spiral galaxies and current formation theories of spiral galaxies. UV-light observations show several cases of faint, ring-like and spiral structures of hot young stars that have formed along the network of cooled inflowing gas, extending far from the visible luminous galactic disc. If conditions are favorable, a ring can form in the place of a spiral structure. Since some spiral galaxies are theorized to have formed from massive clouds of intergalactic gas collapsing and then rotationally forming into a disc structure, one could assume that a ring disc could form in place of a spiral disc if, as mentioned before, conditions are favorable. This holds true for protogalaxies, or galaxies just throughout to be forming, and old galaxies that has migrated into a section of space with a higher gas content than its previous locations.

List

See also
 List of galaxies
 Polar-ring galaxy

References

Ring galaxies